The Pune–Nasik railway line is a proposed higher speed railway between the cities of Pune and Nashik. The project will allow trains to cover the 235.5 km route in around two hours at speeds of up to 200 km/h, including future-proofing for 250 km/h.

Once completed this will link two of the most important industrial cities of India and thus will complete Maharashtra's industrial triangle (Mumbai, Pune and Nashik) link by rail. This will also benefit growth of trade and commerce in both cities and also will help growth of rural industries on the route. This link will also benefit some spiritual destinations like Bhimashankar Jyotirlinga, Ashatavinayak at Ojhar and Lenyadri and Pabal Jain temple. The new industrial zone at Chakan, Rajgurunagar and Sinnar area will get a rail connectivity by this project.for this railway line recently notice for land acquisition in khed tahsil has been published by khed subdivision officer namely vikrant chavan and fixed limitations of 15 days to raise objection regarding rate and other issues 

It will be funded from a mixture of state government and private investor money.

Route

Old Plan
The Nasik road to Sinnar/Gulwanch section requires land from ten villages Eklahare, Hinganwedhe and Jakori in Nashik taluka, Jogaltembi, Nayangaon, Dashwandi, Patpimri, Baragaon Pimpri and Gulwanch in Sinnar Taluka and Pimpalgaon-Nipani in Niphad Taluka. Due to the length of route this plan was scrapped. (265 km by rail compared to 202 km by road between Pune and Nashik road)

New plan
However this route was revised and now will be 231 km instead of old 265 km. There will be total of 24 stations out of which 8 are major and 16 minor and 18 tunnels on the new route and construction will be completed by 2022/23. There will be major stations at Chakan, Rajgurunagar, Manchar, Narayangaon, Ale Phata, Sangamner, Sinnar and Satpur. This will be a double track project supporting speed of 200 - 250 kmhr. Operation speed will be restricted to 140 kmhr and is expected to reduce journey time to 2 hours.

Rolling stock

These trains will make 8 trips per day for each rake. There will be total of 48 trips in a day. The signaling will be ERTMS-II signaling system. The EMUs will be designed for 25KV AC traction. It is expected that daily 87,000 commuters will commute on this route.

References

External links
 Finally, Central Railway to carry out survey for new Pune-Nashik line
 Pune-Nashik road semi highspeed rail project (Maharail)
 Pune - Nasik semi-high speed rail

5 ft 6 in gauge railways in India
Rail transport in Maharashtra
Proposed railway lines in India
Proposed rail infrastructure in India
Transport in Nashik
Transport in Pune
Proposed infrastructure in Maharashtra